Kirghiz Autonomous Socialist Soviet Republic may refer to:
Kirghiz Autonomous Socialist Soviet Republic (1920–25)
Kirghiz Autonomous Socialist Soviet Republic (1926–36)